František Merta (born 1951) caused a scandal in the Czech Republic in 2000 when, while serving as a Catholic priest in the Olomouc Archdiocese, he was convicted of indecent assault of 20 boys dating back to 1995.

Scandal
Merta was accused by a theology student, Václav Novák, and was sentenced by a criminal court to a two-year suspended sentence. The archbishop of Olomouc, Jan Graubner, was accused of moving Merta to different posts in an attempt to cover up the case. Merta is still employed by the Catholic church as a civil employee in the archdiocese archives, though according to a spokeswoman for the Archdiocese of Olomouc, he has no contact with children.

References

1951 births
Living people
Czech criminals
Catholic Church sexual abuse scandals in Europe
Catholic priests convicted of child sexual abuse
People convicted of indecent assault
20th-century Czech Roman Catholic priests
21st-century Czech Roman Catholic priests
Czechoslovak Roman Catholic priests
Violence against men in Europe